Arrowsmithia is a genus of flowering plants in the family Asteraceae.

 Species
Species accepted by the Plants of the World Online as of December 2022: 

Arrowsmithia abyssinica 
Arrowsmithia conferta 
Arrowsmithia corymbosa 
Arrowsmithia deflexa 
Arrowsmithia ericifolia 
Arrowsmithia glandulosa 
Arrowsmithia hamata 
Arrowsmithia pulvinaris 
Arrowsmithia revoluta 
Arrowsmithia sororis 
Arrowsmithia styphelioides 
Arrowsmithia tenuifolia

References

Gnaphalieae
Asteraceae genera